San Francisco Mining District may mean:

 San Francisco Mining District (Utah),  in the vicinity of Frisco, Utah
 San Francisco Mining District (Arizona), in Mohave County, Arizona